Thakarachenda is a 2007 Malayalam film directed by debutant Avira Rebecca with Sreenivasan and Geethu Mohandas in the lead. The film is based on a real-life incident. The film was released on 9 August 2021, along with Shaji N. Karun's docu-fiction AKG.

A drama by genre, the film is an example of black humour and sarcastic comments. It received the Best Debut Director Award and Special Jury Award (Sreenivasan) at the Kerala State Film Awards.

Plot
The film is set in a slum in Ernakulam and focuses on a group of slum dwellers who are usually ignored in the ambitious blueprints of city developers. The protagonist of the film, Chakrapani, is a disabled beggar and also a small-time moneylender who lives in the slum. A drunkard, he spends most of the time quarrelling with his mother. He has an eye on Latha who lives nearby with her two children, Siva and Malli, though she detests him. Latha, an asthmatic, works as a maid and dreams of a better future for her children. Another woman Vasanthi too lives in the slum with her two children and a drunkard of a husband who is of no use to anybody and who keeps causing endless trouble to her and her children. Finally, desperation forces Chakrapani and Latha to unite and raise their voice in protest again the ignorance towards their slum. Chakrapani ends up as their leader. The story reaches its climax when the government takes steps to get rid of the slum in order to go on with developmental activities and the slum-dwellers find that they have nowhere to go. A JCB arrives on the scene and the local people protest as a union with Chakrapani in the forefront. But their pleas fall on deaf ears.

Cast
 Sreenivasan as Chakrapani
 Geethu Mohandas as Latha
 Seema G. Nair as Vasanthi 
 Manikandan Pattambi as Suni

References

External links
 

2000s Malayalam-language films
Films shot in Kochi